Two destroyers of the Spanish Navy were named Jorge Juan:

 , the former USS McGowan, acquired by the Spanish Navy in 1960 and scrapped in 1988

Spanish Navy ship names